Ruth Elizabeth Harley  is a New Zealand theatre, film and television executive.

Early life and education 
Harley was born in Nelson, New Zealand and completed her secondary education at  Nelson College for Girls. She graduated from the University of Canterbury with a BA and then moved to the University of Auckland for her PhD.

Career 
Harley worked for the QEII Arts Council, where she was responsible for theatre funding and worked in a liaison role.

She moved to TVNZ in 1986 as commissioning editor of projects including the film, An Angel at My Table, and television series, such as Public Eye and That’s Fairly Interesting.

Harley was appointed chief executive officer of the New Zealand Film Commission in 1997. Films funded during her tenure included Whale Rider, starring Academy Award nominated, Keisha Castle-Hughes and The World's Fastest Indian, starring Anthony Hopkins.

From 2008 to 2013 Harley served as the inaugural chief executive officer of Screen Australia. In this role she oversaw the amalgamation of three film agencies to become Screen Australia. Projects funded under her leadership included films such as The Sapphires and the television series Redfern Now.

Harley was appointed chair of NZ On Air Irirangi Te Motu in 2018 and reappointed for a further three years in 2021.

Awards and recognition 
Harley was awarded the New Zealand Suffrage Centennial Medal in 1993.

She was appointed an Officer of the Order of the British Empire in the 1996 New Year Honours for her work in broadcasting and in  the 2006 New Year Honours, she was made a Companion of the New Zealand Order of Merit in recognition for her service to the film industry in New Zealand.

References 

Living people
Year of birth missing (living people)
People educated at Nelson College for Girls
University of Canterbury alumni
University of Auckland alumni
Recipients of the New Zealand Suffrage Centennial Medal 1993
New Zealand Officers of the Order of the British Empire
Companions of the New Zealand Order of Merit